Chirag (Chirag: xarʁnilla kub) is a language in the Dargin dialect continuum spoken in Dagestan, Russia. It is often considered a divergent dialect of Dargwa. Ethnologue lists it under the dialects of Dargwa but recognizes that it may be a separate language.

Classification 
Based on lexical similarity, Chirag is usually classified as a separate language from other varieties of Dargwa. It has 67% lexical similarity with the North-Central group, 77.6% with the South group, and 69% with Kaitag; within the South group, it has 84% lexical similarity with Qunqi Amuq.

Phonology

Vowels 

Prosody 

In Chirag, stressed syllables are specified for tone.

Morphophonology 

Chirag has some phonological processes that pertain to specific morphological elements. The plural suffix -e attracts stress and induces vowel deletion on the final syllable of disyllabic nouns (e.g., qisqan 'spider', qisqne 'spiders'). Verbal prefixes have optional front/back vowel harmony.

Grammar 

Chirag is head-final, has fairly flexible word order and is rich with inflectional morphology. It has ergative–absolutive alignment in its case marking; the subject of a transitive verb is overtly marked with ergative case, and the subject of an intransitive verb and the object of a transitive verb are unmarked:

References

External links 
 ELAR archive of Chirag Documentation Project

Northeast Caucasian languages